In Too Deep: Music from the Dimension Motion Picture is the soundtrack to Michael Rymer's 1999 crime film In Too Deep. It was released on August 17, 1999 via Sony Music Soundtrax/Columbia Records, and contained hip hop and R&B music. The soundtrack fared well on the Billboard charts, peaking at #28 on the Billboard 200 and #8 on the Top R&B/Hip-Hop Albums chart. Also featured on the soundtrack was a then unknown 50 Cent's debut single "How to Rob", which made it to #62 on the Hot R&B/Hip-Hop Songs chart and #24 on the Hot Rap Singles chart. It featured six charting singles; "In Too Deep", "Keys to the Range", "How to Rob", "Rowdy Rowdy", "Quiet Storm" and "Tear It Off".

Track listing

Charts

References

External links

1999 soundtrack albums
Hip hop soundtracks
Columbia Records soundtracks
Rhythm and blues soundtracks
Albums produced by Erick Sermon
Albums produced by Trackmasters
Albums produced by Jermaine Dupri
Albums produced by Havoc (musician)
Albums produced by Bryan-Michael Cox